Operación Triunfo is the Argentine version of the series Operación Triunfo based on the international series Star Academy.

Until 2009, 4 editions were held. It was hosted by Marley.

The program had a comeback in 2012–2013 with a new 5th season and a change in format, by the Argentine television station Telefe. The new edition, hosted by Germán Paoloski, is just for female contestants, with the aim of forming a girl group.

Editions

Season 1 (2003)

Contestants 
18 contestants were presented in Gala 1.

|}

 
2003 Argentine television series debuts